René Thomas may refer to:

 René Thomas (sport shooter) (1865–1925), French sport shooter
 René Thomas (racing driver) (1886–1975), French motor racing champion and pioneer aviator
 René Thomas (guitarist) (1927–1975), Belgian jazz guitarist
 René Thomas (biologist) (1928–2017), Belgian scientist